Flintshire County Council is the unitary local authority for the county of Flintshire, one of the principal areas of Wales. It is based at County Hall in Mold.

Elections take place every five years. The last election was on 5 May 2022.

History
Flintshire County Council was first created in 1889 under the Local Government Act 1888, which established elected county councils to take over the administrative functions of the quarter sessions. That county council and the administrative county of Flintshire were abolished in 1974, when the area merged with neighbouring Denbighshire to become the new county of Clwyd. Flintshire was unusual in retaining exclaves right up until the 1974 reforms. The contiguous part of the county was split to become three of the six districts of Clwyd: Alyn and Deeside, Delyn, and Rhuddlan. The county's exclaves of Maelor Rural District and the parish of Marford and Hoseley both went to the Wrexham Maelor district.

Under the Local Government (Wales) Act 1994, Clwyd County Council and the county's constituent districts were abolished, being replaced by principal areas, whose councils perform the functions which had previously been divided between the county and district councils. The two districts of Alyn and Deeside and Delyn were merged to become a new county of Flintshire, which came into effect on 1 April 1996. The Flintshire County Council created in 1996 therefore covers a smaller area than the pre-1974 county, omitting the Rhuddlan district, which went to the new Denbighshire county, and omitting the pre-1974 exclaves, which form part of Wrexham County Borough.

Political control
The first election to the new council was held in 1995, initially operating as a shadow authority before coming into its powers on 1 April 1996. Political control of the council since 1996 has been held by the following parties:

Leadership
The leaders of the council since 1996 have been:

Current composition 
As of 1 July 2022.

Elections
Since 2012, elections have taken place every five years. The last election was 5 May 2022.

Party with the most elected councillors in bold. Coalition agreements in notes column.

By the May 2017 elections the Labour Group held 34 seats on the council and held the same number after the election results came in, though they had gained seats in some wards (for example Llanfynydd) and lost in others (e.g. Bagillt East). Fourteen (13 Lab & 1 Ind) of the seventy seats were elected unopposed.

Following the elections in 2012 the council was governed by a coalition between Labour and a group of some of the Independents.  Labour was the largest political group within the council with 34 members, followed by the Independent Alliance (14), Conservatives (6), Independents (6), the Liberal Democrats (5), and the New Independents (5).

Premises
The council is based at County Hall on Raikes Lane in Mold, which was built in 1967 for the original Flintshire County Council. Between 1974 and 1996 the building had been the headquarters of Clwyd County Council. When Flintshire was re-established as an administrative area in 1996 the new council inherited County Hall and the relatively new offices (built 1992) of Alyn and Deeside Borough Council at St David's Park in Ewloe in the community of Hawarden. The building at Ewloe was leased to Unilever for some years and was renamed Unity House. By 2018, County Hall was proving very costly to maintain, while Unilever's lease of Unity House had ended and the council had tried to sell it without success. The council therefore decided to move several departments to Unity House, which it renamed Ty Dewi Sant. The rear wings of County Hall were then demolished in 2020, retaining only the front part of the building which includes the council chamber and some office space. County Hall therefore continues to serve as the council's official headquarters and meeting place, but many of the council's staff are now based at Ty Dewi Sant. The council also has an area office at Chapel Street in Flint called County Offices (formerly Delyn House) which it inherited from Delyn Borough Council.

Electoral divisions

Since the 2022 elections, the county has been divided into 45 wards, returning 67 councillors.

Few communities in Flintshire are coterminous with electoral wards.  The following table lists the wards as existed prior to 2022 along with the communities and associated geographical areas. Communities with a community council are indicated by *:

References

External links
Flintshire County Council

Politics of Flintshire
Local authorities of Wales
Organisations based in Flintshire